Hughie is a masculine given name and nickname (usually of the given name Hugh). People named Hughie include:

People with the given name 

 Hughie Charles (1907–1995), English songwriter, co-writer of "We'll Meet Again" and "There'll Always Be an England"
 Hughie Edwards (1914–1982), Royal Air Force air commodore, Governor of Western Australia and Australian recipient of the Victoria Cross
 Hughie Flint (born 1941), English drummer
 Hughie Fury (born 1994), British boxer
 Hughie Hay (c. 1932–2012), Scottish footballer
 Hughie Hughes (c. 1885–1916), British racecar driver
 Hughie Lee-Smith (1915–1999), American artist and teacher
 Hughie Mack (1884–1927), American silent film actor
 Hughie McPherson (1918–2013), Australian rules footballer
 Hughie Mulligan (died 1973), New York mobster and bookmaker
 Hughie O'Donoghue (born 1953), British painter
 Hughie Odgers (1889–1958), Australian rules footballer
 Hughie Webb (1878–1958), Australian rules footballer
 Hughie Williams (born 1933), Australian trade unionist and Olympic wrestler
 Hughie Wilson (1869–1940), Scottish footballer

People with the nickname 

 Hugh Adcock (1903–1975), English footballer
 Hughie Callan (1881–1917), Australian rules footballer
 Hughie Cannon (1877–1912), American composer and lyricist who wrote "Won't You Come Home Bill Bailey"
 Hughie Carroll (1885–1965), Australian cricketer
 Hughie Clifford (1866–1929), Scottish footballer
 Hughie Critz (1900–1980), American Major League Baseball player
 Hughie Dickson (1895–1965), English footballer
 Hughie Dow (1906–1987), English footballer
 Hughie Dunn (1875 or 1878–?) Scottish footballer
 Hughie Ferguson (1898–1930), Scottish footballer
 Hughie Gallacher (1903–1957), Scottish footballer
 Hugh Gallacher (footballer, born 1930) (1930–2013), Scottish footballer
 Hughie Green (1920–1997), English television presenter
 Hughie Hearne (1873–1932), American Major League Baseball catcher
 Hugh James (1890–1967), Australian rules footballer
 Hughie Jennings (1869–1928), American Major League Baseball player and manager
 Hughie Jones (1927–2016), Anglican Archdeacon of Loughborough from 1986 to 1992
 Hughie Kelly (1923–2009), Scottish football player and manager
 Hughie Lehman (1885–1961), Canadian National Hockey League goaltender and head coach
 Hughie McAlees (1879–1964), Australian politician 
 Hughie McIlmoyle (born 1940), Scottish retired footballer
 Hughie Miller (1886–1945), American Major League Baseball player
 Hugh Morrow (footballer), English footballer in the 1940s and '50s and manager (1967–1971)
 Hughie O'Reilly (1904–1976), Gaelic footballer and manager
 Hughie Phillips (1864–?), English footballer
 Hughie Reed (1950–1992), Scottish footballer
 Hughie Russell (1921–1991), English footballer
 Hughie Thomasson, Jr. (1952–2007), American guitarist and singer
 Hugh Turner (footballer, born 1904), English former football goalkeeper

See also 

 "Hughie Graham", title character of ballad 
 Huey (disambiguation)

Lists of people by nickname
Hypocorisms